Dr Mwiria Valerian Kilemi (born May 17, 1954) is a Kenyan politician and scholar. He belongs to the Maendeleo Chap Chap party headed by Machakos Governor Alfred Mutua and was elected to represent the Tigania West Constituency in the National Assembly of Kenya in the 2007 Kenyan parliamentary election.

In 2012, he contested and lost the Meru County gubernatorial seat to Peter Munya, in a disputed election that was unsuccessfully challenged in court. At the moment, he is the presidential advisor on education. He has also contested for Member of Parliament, Tigania west, in the 2022 elections and lost. His most notable achievements has been the chairing of the task force mandated to review the secondary school fees structure. This has been lauded by the parents and the general public at large.

References

Living people
Meru people
1954 births
Party of National Unity (Kenya) politicians
Members of the National Assembly (Kenya)